Baltiysky (masculine), Baltiyskaya (feminine), or Baltiyskoye (neuter) may refer to:
Baltiysky District, several districts and city districts in Russia
Baltiyskoye Urban Settlement, a municipal formation which the town of district significance of Baltiysk in Baltiysky District of Kaliningrad Oblast, Russia is incorporated as
Baltiysky (inhabited locality) (Baltiyskaya, Baltiyskoye), several rural localities in Russia
Baltiysky railway station, a railway terminal in St. Petersburg, Russia
Baltiyskaya Nuclear Power Plant, or Kaliningrad Nuclear Power Plant, a nuclear power plant under construction on the Neman River in Kaliningrad Oblast, Russia
Baltiyskaya (Saint Petersburg Metro), an underground metro station adjacent to Baltiysky railway station in St. Petersburg, Russia